Maria Brontë (commonly ; 23 April 1814 – 6 May 1825) was the eldest daughter of Patrick Brontë and Maria Brontë, née Branwell.

She was the elder sister of Elizabeth Brontë, writers Charlotte, Emily, and Anne Brontë, and of painter and poet Branwell. She was born in Hartshead, Yorkshire, and died at the age of 11.

Early life and education 
At the age of six, Maria was characterised as "grave, thoughtful, and quiet, to a degree far beyond her years". After their mother's death in 1821, Maria and her sisters became withdrawn, preferring to only be in each other's company. Maria often read the many newspapers brought home by their father and relayed their contents to her younger sisters.

Maria was said to have been a precocious child; asked at the age of 10 "what...the best mode of spending time [was]" by her father, she answered, "by laying it out in preparation for a happy eternity." Patrick later said that he could speak with Maria on any popular or current topics as freely and amply as with an adult, mournfully recalling her "powerfully intellectual mind". A printer from Thornton, West Yorkshire, where the family had moved in 1815, noted that Patrick once entrusted the reviewing of one of his galley proofs to Maria. Charlotte would later describe her older sister as being rather serious and silent, and Elizabeth Gaskell, Charlotte's friend and, later, biographer, described Maria as "delicate, unusually clever and thoughtful for her age, gentle, and untidy". In 1820, her father moved the family to Haworth.

In 1823, 9-year-old Maria and 8-year-old Elizabeth were sent to Crofton Hall, a fashionable Yorkshire boarding school. The fees, however, proved to be too high for Patrick, who also had three younger daughters in need of a good education. So, in July 1824, Maria and Elizabeth joined Cowan Bridge School, a newly opened boarding school for daughters of the clergy in Lancashire, with Charlotte and Emily following two months later. The food provided by the school was generally poorly cooked and unhealthy, and the cook was reported to be "careless, dirty, and wasteful". Both Maria and Elizabeth had just recovered from measles and whooping cough, and, despite being hungry, they often could not eat. In the school register, Maria is summarily described as such:
Maria Brontë, aged 10 ... reads tolerably. Writes pretty well. Ciphers a little. Works badly. Very little of geography or history. Has made some progress in reading French, but knows nothing of the language grammatically.
Ms. Andrews, a teacher at Cowan Bridge, described Maria as "a girl of fine imagination and extra-ordinary talents". School records show that, as Maria, Charlotte, and Emily were being trained to become governesses, Patrick paid an extra £3 for each girl for them to be taught French, music and drawing.

Death 
In spring 1825, a typhoid epidemic swept through the school, causing the departure of almost a sixth of the students between February and June. By the winter of 1824, Maria's health was rapidly deteriorating and, after she was diagnosed with tuberculosis in February 1825, she was swiftly returned home. She lived at the parsonage in Haworth for three months, alongside her father, brother Branwell, and youngest sister Anne, who had not yet been sent to school, until she eventually succumbed to her illness on May 6, shortly after her 11th birthday. Meanwhile, Elizabeth, whose health had also been declining, was likewise diagnosed with tuberculosis. She, too, was removed from school, arriving in Haworth three weeks after Maria's death.

Elizabeth would die only two weeks later. In the wake of their sisters' deaths, Charlotte and Emily were withdrawn from Cowan Bridge, and never sent back to school; Anne, for one, was never sent to school in the first place after the tragedy, being educated at home, mostly by her father and aunt. Patrick would later connect Maria's death to a higher meaning, writing that "she exhibited during her illness many symptoms of a heart under divine influence."

Influence 
According to Elizabeth Gaskell, Maria served as the inspiration for Helen Burns, Jane's pious and stoical friend, whom she meets in a girl's boarding school, in Charlotte's acclaimed debut novel, Jane Eyre. In 1849, Charlotte, writing to her publisher's reader, admitted that Maria's "prematurely developed and remarkable intellect, as well as the mildness, wisdom and fortitude of her character... left an indelible impression". The harsh living conditions the sisters faced at Cowan Bridge, though not necessarily falling below the standard of the time, are also known to have inspired another character in Jane Eyre: Miss Scatcherd, the cruel and strict teacher who constantly berates and punishes Helen, is modelled after a teacher at Cowan Bridge who subjected Charlotte's "gentle patient dying sister [Maria]" to "worrying and cruelty". Eventually, after much suffering and much like Maria, Helen dies of tuberculosis in Jane's arms.

References

External links 
 

1813 births
1825 deaths
19th-century English people
19th-century English women
Maria
People from Haworth
Child deaths
19th-century deaths from tuberculosis
Tuberculosis deaths in England